Figueruelas (population 1,040) is a small town and municipality in the Spanish Autonomous Region of Aragón, province of Zaragoza.

The town is home to a Opel car factory, opened in 1982, which has built five generations of the Corsa supermini since then.

References

Municipalities in the Province of Zaragoza